Michaela Eichwald (born 1967) is a German painter based in Berlin. Her work mostly consists of abstract paintings using mixed media (including acrylic and oil paints, spray paint, wax, lacquer, paper) on different surfaces (pleather, fabrics). Art critic Christopher Knight described her influences as, "Abstract Expressionism, Japanese Gutai and 1980s Neo-Expressionism, both German and American." Eichwald's paintings have been shown at the Museum of Modern Art, Museum Brandhorst, the Rennes Biennial, dépendance, Reena Spaulings Fine Art, Maureen Paley's gallery, and other art galleries.

References

German women painters
Living people
20th-century German painters
21st-century German painters
20th-century German women artists
21st-century German women artists
1967 births